AgustaWestland was an Anglo-Italian helicopter design and manufacturing company, which was a wholly owned subsidiary of Finmeccanica (now known as Leonardo). It was formed in July 2000 as an Anglo-Italian multinational company, when Finmeccanica and GKN merged their respective helicopter subsidiaries (Agusta and Westland Helicopters) to form AgustaWestland, with each holding a 50% share. Finmeccanica acquired GKN's stake in AgustaWestland in 2004.

In 2016, AgustaWestland was merged into Leonardo S.p.A. (formerly Finmeccanica), where it became the company's helicopters division under the Leonardo Helicopters brand. "AgustaWestland" still exists as a subsidiary of Leonardo but the AgustaWestland public brand is no longer promoted.

History
The collaboration between Agusta and Westland dates back to 1981, when the two companies established the European Helicopter Industries joint venture with the aim of developing a new medium-size utility helicopter, the EH101.

In March 1999, Finmeccanica and GKN announced their intention to merge their respective helicopter subsidiaries. The two parties announced finalised terms for the merger in July 2000, which included a 50-50 ownership structure, and the payment of top-up fees to GKN to compensate for a disparity in profit levels between Agusta and Westland.

In January 2002, AgustaWestland announced that it would be cutting a total of 950 jobs in the United Kingdom and closing its factory in Weston-super-Mare, which carried out customer support work, as activity was concentrated at its main site in Yeovil.
 
On 26 May 2004, GKN confirmed that it had agreed to sell its share of AgustaWestland to Finmeccanica for £1.06 billion. The sale was approved by the British government in October 2004.

AgustaWestland opened offices in Philadelphia in 2005 and won a contract to build the new presidential helicopter Marine One over the U.S. manufacturer Sikorsky Aircraft, but this program was cancelled in 2009. In November 2005, it was announced that AgustaWestland had agreed to acquire Bell Helicopter's 25 per cent interest in the AB139 medium twin helicopter program, and to increase its interest in the BA609 civil tiltrotor aircraft from 25 per cent to 40 per cent.

In June 2008, AgustaWestland and the Russia-based helicopter manufacturer Russian Helicopters agreed to form a new joint venture company to assemble AW139 helicopters in Russia. Construction of a $50 million helicopter assembly facility in the town of Tomilino near Moscow began in June 2010.

In early 2010, AgustaWestland acquired PZL-Świdnik, a Polish helicopter manufacturer.

In September 2012, AgustaWestland and Northrop Grumman announced the signing of a comprehensive teaming agreement under which the companies would jointly bid for contracts to build the U.S. Air Force Combat Rescue helicopter and U.S. Navy's new "Marine One" presidential helicopter.

In March 2013, AgustaWestland announced its Project Zero hybrid tiltrotor/fan-in-wing technology demonstrator. The unmanned demonstrator made its first tethered flight in June 2011 at AgustaWestland's Cascina Costa, Italy facility. According to the company, the aircraft "employs no hydraulics, doesn't burn fossil fuel and generates zero emissions."

AgustaWestland AW101 order controversy 

India signed a contract to purchase 12 AgustaWestland AW101 helicopters in February 2010 for the Communication Squadron of Indian Air Force to carry the president, PM and other VVIPs.  The contract was frozen in February 2013 after allegations surfaced that US$60 million had been paid as a bribe. On 12 February 2013, Giuseppe Orsi, the CEO of Finmeccanica, was arrested by Italian authorities; the following day Indian Defence Minister A.K. Antony ordered a probe into the contract. 

In January 2014, India cancelled the US$630 million deal, subsequently recovering the sum which it had paid.

Merger into Leonardo 
In 2016, following a corporate reorganization, AgustaWestland merged into Leonardo S.p.A., Finmeccanica's new name. With this reorganization, AgustaWestland ceased to exist as a separate company, and it became Leonardo's helicopter division.

In 2020 Leonardo relaunched the "Agusta" brand for the VIP helicopter sector. The launch of the new brand was announced during Expo 2020 in Dubai.

Products

See also

 List of Italian companies
Comparable major helicopter manufacturers:
 Airbus Helicopters
 Bell Helicopter
 Boeing Rotorcraft Systems
 MD Helicopters
 Russian Helicopters
 Sikorsky Aircraft

References

External links
 
 AgustaWestland section of helis.com (helicopter history site)

 
Defunct aircraft manufacturers of Italy
Defunct aircraft manufacturers of the United Kingdom
Defunct helicopter manufacturers
Helicopter manufacturers of Italy
Defunct helicopter manufacturers of the United Kingdom
Vehicle manufacturing companies established in 2000
Vehicle manufacturing companies disestablished in 2016
Technology companies established in 2000
Technology companies disestablished in 2016
British companies established in 2000
Italian companies established in 2000
Italian companies disestablished in 2016
British companies disestablished in 2016
Manufacturing companies based in Rome
Leonardo S.p.A.